Greenspace or green space may refer to:
 Greenspace or open space reserve, protected areas of undeveloped landscape.
 Urban green space, open space areas for "parks", "green spaces", and other open areas
 Greenspace, the natural environment.
 Greenbelt, a policy or land use designation used in land use planning.
 Greenway (landscape), a linear greenspace running through an urban area.
 Green infrastructure, a concept in land use planning
 Greenspace Information for Greater London (GiGL), the environmental record centre for London
 GreenSpace (video game)